Gas is a 1981 Canadian comedy film released by Paramount Pictures, the plot of which was inspired by the 1979 energy crisis. The film was directed by Les Rose and produced by Claude Héroux.

Plot summary
A small Midwestern town is thrown into chaos when the local oil tycoon Duke Stuyvesant orchestrates a phony oil shortage in order to increase profits. News reporter Jane Beardsley tries to uncover the plot. Radio DJ Nick the Noz, observing from his station's news helicopter, reports on the craziness caused by the gasoline shortage.

Cast
  Susan Anspach  ...  Jane Beardsley
  Howie Mandel  ...  Matt Lloyd
  Sterling Hayden  ...  Duke Stuyvesant
  Helen Shaver  ...  Rhonda
  Sandee Currie  ...  Sarah Marshal
  Peter Aykroyd  ...  Ed Marshal
  Keith Knight  ...  Ira
  Alf Humphreys  ...  Lou Picard
  Philip Akin  ...  Lincoln Jones
  Michael Hogan  ...  Guido Vespucci
  Paul Kelman  ...  Nino Vespucci
  Donald Sutherland  ...  Nick the Noz
  Dustin Waln  ...  Earl Stuyvesant
  Vlasta Vrána  ...  Baron Stuyvesant
  Harvey Chao  ...  Lee Kwan
  Walker Boone ... Gangster #1 (Dutch)

Home Media
The film was released on VHS in January 1982 by Paramount Home Video. To date, it has not been released on DVD or Blu-ray.

References

External links
 
 
 Gas at VideoHound's Golden Movie Retriever
 

1981 films
1981 comedy films
English-language Canadian films
Films scored by Paul Zaza
Canadian comedy films
Films directed by Les Rose
1980s English-language films
1980s Canadian films